Jessica Tace Smith  is an Australian Paralympic swimmer and motivational speaker.

Swimming 
Smith swam for Australia for seven years and represented Australia at the 2004 Paralympic Games in Athens, Greece.

Motivational speaking and body image advocacy 
Smith began working with the Butterfly Foundation as a body image advocate. She now works professionally as an MC, and motivational and public speaker.

Author 
Published in July 2015, Little Miss Jessica Goes to School is a children's book written by Smith as a resource for children with a hand or arm difference.

Awards 
Smith was awarded an OAM in 2019 for service to the community.

In 2017 she was awarded a Cosmopolitan Woman of the Year as a Game Changer.

She was named an Emerging Leader by the Australian Government at the Positive Body Image Awards, and received a Pride of Australia Medal in Western Australia. In 2015, she was a state finalist for Young Australian of the Year.

Personal life 
Smith was born without her left forearm. As a young child she sustained serious burns to 15% of her body. In her teens she overcame an eating disorder and depression.

Smith married Hamid Salamati in 2015 and has three children. She later converted to her husband's Islam at his family's request.

References

External links
 Official website

Living people
Year of birth missing (living people)
Australian female freestyle swimmers
Female Paralympic swimmers of Australia
Swimmers at the 2004 Summer Paralympics
Converts to Islam
Australian Muslims